Erwarton or Arwarton is a small village and civil parish in the Babergh district of Suffolk, England. The parish includes the hamlet of Shop Corner.

Neighbouring villages include Shotley, Shotley Gate, Harkstead, Chelmondiston and Holbrook.

The name originates from the Early Saxon  Eoforweard tūn.

Places of interest

St. Mary's church, Erwarton
Monuments within St. Mary's church date from the 13th century, although the present building is largely 15th century.  A copy of a drawing of Queen Anne Boleyn by Holbein is attached to the 1912 organ. Under the organ is a note stating "...after her execution in the Tower of London, 19 May 1536, it was recorded that her heart was buried in this church by her Uncle, Sir Philip Parker of Erwarton Hall". In 1837 a leaden casket was discovered in the church which, by tradition, is believed to contain Boleyn's heart, although there was no inscription. The church baptismal font is adorned with a rather distinctive example of a Tudor Rose. The church tower was strengthened in the 1800s after damage by lightning, but by 2012 was in desperate need of repair.

Erwarton Hall
Erwarton Hall, a Grade II* listed building, was rebuilt in about 1575.  The Grade I listed gatehouse is a well-known local landmark.

Queens Head
The Queens Head, a Grade II listed public house, dates from the 17th century or earlier. This pub was formerly owned by Tolly Cobbold.

History

Twentieth century plague outbreak
Between 1906 and 1918 the area saw the last outbreak of plague in England. This happened on the Shotley peninsular and in Trimley, now part of Felixstowe. A total of 22 people were affected, 6 recovered, the rest died. The last two cases were from Warren Cottages, Erwarton: On 8 June 1918, Mrs Annie Mary Bugg of Warren Lane Cottages, Erwarton aged 52, fell ill and died on 13 June 1918 and was buried in Erwarton church yard. No sign of her grave can be found now. On 16 June 1918 Bugg's neighbour Mrs Gertrude Allice Garrod, aged 42, of Warren Lane Cottages also fell ill and died on 19 June 1918, and was also buried at Erwarton graveyard. Her gravestone can still be found there.

Notable residents
Thomas Sedgwick (c. 1512 - 1573), clergyman and professor.
Philip Parker (died 1675), Member of Parliament for Suffolk and High Sheriff of Suffolk.
Sir Philip Parker, 1st Baronet  (c. 1625 – 1690), Member of Parliament for Harwich and Sandwich.
Henry Berners (1769 - 1852), clergyman and Archdeacon of Suffolk.

References

External links

Villages in Suffolk
Civil parishes in Suffolk
Babergh District